Ray Sterrett (born 24 March 1965) is a former Australian rules footballer who played with Geelong in the Victorian/Australian Football League (VFL/AFL).

Sterrett, who came to Geelong from West Australian Football League club East Fremantle, was the sixth selection in the 1988 National Draft. He didn't have to wait long to make his debut, which came in Geelong's 95 point win over the West Coast Eagles in round two. It would be his only appearance in the 1989 season, but he played 15 games in 1990. In 1991 he played in rounds five to eight, before dropping out of the side with a shoulder injury.

References

External links
 
 

1965 births
Australian rules footballers from Western Australia
Geelong Football Club players
East Fremantle Football Club players
Living people